Le nozze d'Ercole e d'Ebe  (The Marriage of Hercules and Hebe) is an opera in two acts composed by Christoph Willibald Gluck to an Italian  libretto by an unknown author. Sometimes referred to as a festa teatrale or serenata, it was first performed in Pillnitz near Dresden on 29 June 1747 to celebrate the double wedding of the Bavarian elector and the Saxon crown prince to each other's sisters.

Roles

References

1747 operas
Italian-language operas
Azioni teatrali
Operas by Christoph Willibald Gluck
Operas
Operas based on classical mythology